Parthibendra Malla was a Malla ruler and the tenth king of Kantipur. He succeeded his brother Nripendra Malla after his death in 1680 as the King of Kantipur.

Reign 
Parthibendra Malla had earlier colluded with his brother Nripendra Malla to install the latter as the King instead of Mahipatendra Malla, their brother and the actual heir. Even during the reign of Nripendra Malla, Parthibendra Malla was the one controlling the city and after Nripendra's death in 1680, Parthibendra Malla succeeded him as the king of Kantipur.

Pathibendra Malla was poisoned to death in 1687 and as many as twenty-four women went Sati. His wife, Riddhilakshmi, however, did not went Sati. He was succeeded by his son Bhupalendra Malla.

References 

Malla rulers of Kantipur
Year of birth unknown
17th-century Nepalese people
Nepalese monarchs
1687 deaths